The Burlington Northern Railroad  was a United States-based railroad company formed from a merger of four major U.S. railroads. Burlington Northern operated between 1970 and 1996.

Its historical lineage begins in the earliest days of railroading with the chartering in 1848 of the Chicago and Aurora Railroad, a direct ancestor line of the Chicago, Burlington and Quincy Railroad, which lends Burlington to the names of various merger-produced successors.

Burlington Northern acquired the Atchison, Topeka and Santa Fe Railway on December 31, 1996, to form the Burlington Northern and Santa Fe Railway (later renamed BNSF Railway), which was owned by the Burlington Northern Santa Fe Corporation. That corporation was purchased by Berkshire Hathaway in 2009 which is controlled by investor Warren Buffett.

History
The Burlington Northern Railroad was the product of the merger of four major railroads: the Great Northern Railway, the Northern Pacific Railway, the Spokane, Portland and Seattle Railway (SP&S) and the Chicago, Burlington and Quincy Railroad (CB&Q).

The four railroads shared a very intertwined history, due to the efforts of James J. Hill, the railroad tycoon who had founded the Great Northern Railway. Hill purchased an interest in the Northern Pacific in 1896 as the railway endured a period of financial turmoil. Hill attempted to merge the two railways but was rebuffed by the leaders of the Northern Pacific.

In 1901, the two railways teamed up to purchase nearly all shares of the Chicago, Burlington and Quincy Railroad, giving both a needed connection to Chicago, the nation's railroad hub. That same year, came the next attempt to merge the railroads with the establishment of the Northern Securities Company, a trust that controlled all three, with Hill serving as president. The company was sued in 1902 under the Sherman Antitrust Act and in 1904 the Justice Department won in the Supreme Court ruling Northern Securities Co. v. United States.

Although the ruling forced the three companies to be operated independently, they were still closely linked, even sharing a headquarters building, the Railroad and Bank Building in Saint Paul, Minnesota. In 1905, the Spokane, Portland and Seattle Railway was founded. Like the Chicago, Burlington and Quincy Railroad, this new railroad was co-owned by the Great Northern and Northern Pacific and allowed both to access the Pacific Northwest.

Leaders attempted to merge another two times, in 1927 and 1955, but were unsuccessful.

The four railroads were finally cleared to merge on March 2, 1970, after a legal challenge that once again went to the Supreme Court. A newly established holding company, Burlington Northern, Inc. purchased the four railroad companies and merged them into the Burlington Northern Railroad, and Louis W. Menk was the company’s first president, chairman, and CEO.

To further expand the Burlington Northern, a single track was constructed in 1972 into the Powder River Basin to serve various coal mines. The expansion was a source of traffic unprecedented in United States railroad history. In 1971, the first full year for the new railroad, trains carried 64,116 million revenue ton-miles of freight, by 1979 the total was 135,004 million. Most of the increase was attributed to Powder River coal from Wyoming.

The Burlington Northern, along with handling freight trains, briefly operated inter-city passenger trains. The BN had started operations just a matter of weeks before the end of service of the original California Zephyr, which had been operated by the CB&Q, in conjunction with the Denver & Rio Grande Western and Western Pacific railroads, and continued to operate the North Coast Limited, Mainstreeter, Empire Builder, Western Star, Denver Zephyr, "Gopher", and "International", until Amtrak took over intercity passenger service in May 1971, thus becoming the last "new" Class I railroad to operate its own passenger trains. The BN also operated a commuter line inherited from the CB&Q from Chicago Union Station to Aurora, Illinois. This line is still owned and operated to this day by the BNSF Railway under a purchase-of-service agreement with Metra.

In May 1980 when Mount St. Helens erupted, the BNR owned the land around the summit of Mount St. Helens in Washington state. In the 19th century, the United States government distributed land to railroads as a way to open up the American West and the 9,677-foot peak was granted to the Northern Pacific. It was inherited in the 1970 merger by Burlington Northern. Following the eruption the land including the volcano was subsequently transferred in a land swap between the railroad and the United States Forest Service so the Mount St. Helens National Volcanic Monument could be established.

On November 21, 1980, the St. Louis–San Francisco Railway was acquired, giving the railroad trackage as far south as Florida.

In the early 1980s two independently operated railroads, owned by Burlington Northern Inc. were absorbed into the Burlington Northern Railroad; the Colorado and Southern Railway was absorbed in 1981, followed by the Fort Worth and Denver Railway in 1982.

The railroad relocated its headquarters from Saint Paul to Seattle, Washington in 1981, as well as its parent company and sister companies.

All of Burlington Northern, Inc's non-rail operations were spun off to a new company, Burlington Resources in 1988.

The railroad once again relocated its headquarters in 1988, moving from Seattle to Fort Worth, Texas.

On September 22, 1995, the Atchison, Topeka and Santa Fe Railway merged with the Burlington Northern to create the Burlington Northern Santa Fe Railway. However, the merger was not official until December 31, 1996, when a common dispatching system was established, Santa Fe's non-union dispatchers were unionized and the implementation of Santa Fe's train identification codes systemwide. On January 24, 2005, the railroad shortened its name to BNSF Railway.

Route

The Burlington Northern traversed the most northerly routes of any railroad in the western United States. These routes started at Chicago, Illinois and ran west-northwest to La Crosse, Wisconsin. From here the routes continued northwest through Minneapolis and St. Paul, Minnesota to Grand Forks, North Dakota. From Grand Forks the routes ran west through North Dakota, Montana, and Idaho to Spokane, Washington. The former GN routed through North Dakota/Northern Montana, crossing the continental divide at Marias Pass, while the former NP line routed through the southern part of Montana (which was spun off to Montana Rail Link in 1987), crossing the continental divide at Mullan and Homestake Passes. At Spokane the routes split into three. The former Great Northern route ran west to Wenatchee, Washington, crossed under the Cascade Range at New Cascade Tunnel on Stevens Pass, and descended to the Puget Sound region through Everett, Washington. The former Northern Pacific turned southwest towards the Tri-Cities, then northwest to Yakima, Washington, and crossed under the Cascade Range at Stampede Tunnel, descending to the Green River Valley at Auburn, Washington where it connected with existing NP lines from British Columbia to Portland, Oregon. The Spokane, Portland and Seattle ran southwest to the Tri-Cities, then followed the north bank of the Columbia River to Vancouver, Washington.With the acquisition of the St. Louis – San Francisco Railway the route was extended into the South Central and Southeastern United States.

Transport Statistics shows BN operated 23609 miles of line and 34691 miles of track at the end of 1970; it shows 4547 SLSF miles of line not including QA&P and AT&N. At the end of 1981 BN showed 27374 miles of line and 40041 miles of track.

At the time of the 1980 eruption of Mount St. Helens the summit of the volcano that was blasted away was owned by Burlington Northern.  Following the eruption, Burlington Northern agreed to a land swap with the U.S. government and exchanged its square mile of land on the mountain for national forest land elsewhere to allow for the creation of the Mount St. Helens National Volcanic Monument to preserve the volcano and allow for its aftermath to be scientifically studied.

Company officers

Presidents of the Burlington Northern Railroad
 Louis W. Menk (1970–1971)
 Robert W. Downing (1971–1976)
 Norman Lorentzsen (1976–1981) 
 Richard C. Grayson (1981–1982)
 Walter A. Drexel (1982–1985)
 Darius W. Gaskins, Jr. (1985–1989)
 Gerald Grinstein (1989–1995)
 Robert D. Krebs (1995–1996) [Post BN]

See also

 Paul Bunyan Trail Rail Trail
 List of Superfund sites in Minnesota

References

External links

 Portrait of a Railroad (1973)
 Friends of the Burlington Northern Railroad (BN historical society)
 Railroads in the Midwest: Early Documents and Images
 List and Family Trees of North American Railroads
 EPA Superfund Fact Sheet for Burlington Northern

 
Companies based in Saint Paul, Minnesota
Defunct Alabama railroads
Defunct Arkansas railroads
Defunct California railroads
Defunct Colorado railroads
Defunct Florida railroads
Defunct Idaho railroads
Defunct Illinois railroads
Defunct Iowa railroads
Defunct Kansas railroads
Defunct Kentucky railroads
Defunct Minnesota railroads
Defunct Mississippi railroads
Defunct Missouri railroads
Defunct Montana railroads
Defunct Nebraska railroads
Defunct New Mexico railroads
Defunct North Dakota railroads
Defunct Oklahoma railroads
Defunct Oregon railroads
Defunct South Dakota railroads
Defunct Tennessee railroads
Defunct Texas railroads
Defunct Washington (state) railroads
Defunct Wisconsin railroads
Defunct Wyoming railroads
Economy of the Midwestern United States
Economy of the Northwestern United States
Former Class I railroads in the United States
Predecessors of the BNSF Railway
Railway companies disestablished in 1996
Railway companies established in 1970
American companies established in 1970